Huangmugang station an interchange station for Line 7 and Line 14 of the Shenzhen Metro. Line 7 platforms opened on 28 October 2016 and Line 14 platforms opened on 28 October 2022.

It will be a massive transfer station of Line 7, Line 14 and Line 24 in the future. Line 24 platforms was reserved during the construction of Huangmugang Comprehensive Transportation Hub Project, built as part of Line 14.

Station layout

Exits
Note: Exit 4 - Exit 12, Exit 14 - Exit 17 are not open.

Gallery

References

External links
 Shenzhen Metro Huangmugang Station (Chinese)
 Shenzhen Metro Huangmugang Station (English)

Shenzhen Metro stations
Railway stations in Guangdong
Futian District
Railway stations in China opened in 2016